The Concert is the second live album by American rock band Creedence Clearwater Revival, released by Fantasy Records in October 1980. It was recorded at the Oakland–Alameda County Coliseum Arena in Oakland, California, on January 31, 1970.

Overview
Originally, the album was mistakenly titled The Royal Albert Hall Concert. When it was discovered that it was not, in fact, recorded at the Royal Albert Hall, it was renamed for later reissues. A Cash Box magazine news article dated January 31, 1981, provides a summary of the mistake:

The album reached No. 62 on the Billboard 200 in 1981. It was awarded gold status (500,000 units sold) by the Recording Industry Association of America on February 27, 1986, and platinum status (1,000,000 units sold) on September 30, 1996.

Track listing

All songs written by John Fogerty, except where noted.

Side one
"Born on the Bayou" – 5:14
"Green River" – 3:00
"Tombstone Shadow" – 4:05
"Don't Look Now" – 2:05
"Travelin' Band" – 2:18
"Who'll Stop the Rain" – 2:31
"Bad Moon Rising" – 2:16
"Proud Mary" – 3:09

Side two
"Fortunate Son" – 2:22
"Commotion" – 2:36
"The Midnight Special" (Traditional, arr. by John Fogerty) – 3:48
"Night Time Is the Right Time" (Nappy Brown, Ozzie Cadena, Lew Herman) – 3:29
"Down on the Corner" – 2:44
"Keep on Chooglin'" – 9:09

Personnel
''Per sleeve notes
John Fogerty – lead guitar, lead vocals, harp
Tom Fogerty – rhythm guitar, backing vocals
Stu Cook – bass, backing vocals
Doug Clifford – drums
Russ Gary – recording
Danny Kopelson – remixing
George Horn – mastering
Phil Carroll – art direction
Jim Marshall – photography

Release history

References

External links

Creedence Clearwater Revival live albums
1980 live albums
Fantasy Records live albums